The mixed 4 × 100 metre freestyle relay S14 swimming event for the 2020 Summer Paralympics took place at the Tokyo Aquatics Centre on 28 August 2021.

Final

References

Swimming at the 2020 Summer Paralympics